The Taichung Folklore Park is a cultural center in Beitun District, Taichung, Taiwan.

History
The construction of the park started in 1984 by Taichung City Council and opened in March 1990.

Architecture
The park spans over an area of 1.6 hectares. It consists of Folklore Hall, Folklore and Cultural Heritage Hall and Folk Arts Hall.

Exhibitions
The park exhibits various folk heritage of people from the coastal area of Fujian at the end of Qing Dynasty.

Transportation
The park is accessible by bus from Taichung Station of Taiwan Railways.

See also
 List of tourist attractions in Taiwan

References

1990 establishments in Taiwan
Cultural centers in Taichung
Taiwanese folklore